Bow Bridge is a 15th-century packhorse bridge over the River Brue in Plox, Bruton, Somerset, England. It has been designated as a Grade I listed building, and Scheduled Ancient Monument.

The bridge may have been built as a link between the former Bruton Abbey, and its courthouse in the High Street. On the parapet on the  western side of the bridge the remains of a carved shield can still be seen. It had acquired the name Bow Bridge by 1707.

The main arch of the bridge is built from chamfered blocks of dressed stone.

The bridge was restored after floods on 12 July 1982.

See also

 List of Grade I listed buildings in South Somerset

References

External links

Bridges completed in the 15th century
Grade I listed buildings in South Somerset
Pedestrian bridges in England
Scheduled monuments in South Somerset
Bridges in Somerset
Bruton
Grade I listed bridges
Packhorse bridges